The West African College of Physicians is a professional society, founded in 1976, for medical specialists in the West African sub-region. The association promotes postgraduate specialist training, professional curriculum development and fellowship certification in six sub-specialties or faculties, Community Health, Family Medicine, Internal Medicine, Paediatrics, Psychiatry and Laboratory Medicine, specifically concentrations in Anatomical Pathology, Chemical Pathology, Haematology and Medical Microbiology. The College also serves as a health policy advisor to many participating governments in West Africa.

History 
Established in 1976, the West African College of Physicians has its headquarters in Lagos, Nigeria. In the early days, membership of the College was limited to the five Anglophone countries of West Africa: Ghana, Liberia, Nigeria, Sierra Leone and The Gambia. Fellowships are categorised by chapters based in 8 member-nations including La Cote d’Ivoire, The Gambia, Ghana, Liberia, Nigeria, Benin, Senegal and Sierra Leone. Membership is now available for medical doctors in Francophone countries. Overall, current members nations include Benin, Burkina Faso, Cape Verde, Côte d'Ivoire, Ghana, Guinea, Guinea-Bissau, Liberia, Mali, Niger, Nigeria, Senegal, Sierra Leone and The Gambia. The College has plans to expand medical outreach and development initiatives in the two Lusophone member states, Cape Verde and Guinea-Bissau.

The College’s sister institution is the West African College of Surgeons, a professional society for surgeons in West Africa. It also has strategic partnerships with the National Postgraduate Medical College of Nigeria, the Ghana College of Physicians and Surgeons and the Medical Research Council in The Gambia. There is educational and scientific collaboration between the West African College of Physicians and Britain’s Royal Medical Colleges especially the Royal College of Physicians of London, the American College of Physicians and the South African Medical College. The Annual General and Scientific Meetings are rotated among the 14 member-nations of the College. From time to time, the College embarks on a five-year strategic plan to set health services delivery objectives for the organisation.

College structure 
Atop the College’s committee hierarchy is the College Council superintends the Finance and General-Purpose Committee which in turn has oversight of the Education and Research Committee, Accreditation Committee, Examination Committee, International Office/Committee and the Quality Assurance Committee. The Faculties/Faculty Boards report to the Education and Research Committee.

At the administrative level, the President is the Head of the College assisted by the Vice Presidency. Below that level is the Secretary-General and Treasurer who supervise the Administrative Officer, Examination Officer and the Accountant. The Vice Presidency consists of eight Vice Presidents who double as Chairpersons for the national chapters. In each member country, the National Treasurer and National Secretary report to the Vice President/Chapter Chairman. The National Secretary oversees the Chapter Faculties.

Faculties 
The six faculties of the College are:
 Community Health
 Family Medicine
 Internal Medicine
 Paediatrics
 Psychiatry
 Laboratory Medicine with options in Anatomical Pathology, Chemical Pathology, Haematology and Medical Microbiology

Medical publications 
The West African College of Physicians, together with the West African College of Surgeons, co-own the West African Journal of Medicine, with the aim of "providing a medium for international dissemination of information about medical science in West Africa and elsewhere." Additionally, the College publishes the Proceedings of its Annual College Lectures as well as other symposia and scientific conferences.

Fellowship examinations 
To be awarded a fellowship in a faculty of the WACP, a candidate must satisfactorily pass the Part I and Part II examinations and complete a clinical rotational training at an accredited institution as well as a written dissertation.

College prizes 
The following academic prizes are awarded to outstanding graduating Fellows of the College:

College leadership

Presidents

Secretary-Generals

Treasurers

References 

College and university associations and consortia in Africa